"Soldier of Fortune" is a blues rock ballad written by Ritchie Blackmore and David Coverdale and originally released on Deep Purple's 1974 album Stormbringer. Although Deep Purple has never released the song as a single and it has never placed on the record charts, it has developed a cult following over the years and has been covered by many artists and bands.

Releases
"Soldier of Fortune" has been released on several albums since Stormbringer:
 Stormbringer (1974)
 Last Concert in Japan (1977)
 Fireworks (Italy-only compilation) (1985)
 This Time Around: Live in Tokyo (2001)
 The Platinum Collection (2005)
 Deepest Purple: The Very Best of Deep Purple 30th Anniversary Edition (2010)

Cover versions
 Whitesnake's version first appeared on the 1997 live album Starkers in Tokyo, then later on The Silver Anniversary Collection (2003), 30th Anniversary Collection (2008) and Made in Britain/World Record (Live) (2013), then in a studio version on their 2015 album The Purple Album, which was also released as a single.
Roadrunner Records lists Opeth's version among their 13 wildest covers, calling it a faithful cover and noting the band's guitarist/vocalist Mikael Åkerfeldt's "unexpectedly soulful vocals".
 Black Majesty on the 2007 album Tomorrowland.
 Bosquito on the 2003 album Cocktail Molotov.
 Blackmore's Night on the 2002 album Past Times with Good Company.
 Gyula Vikidál in a Hungarian version on his 1985 solo album under the title .
 Jiří Schelinger in a Czech version in 1977 under the title  ("Sleeping Beauty").

References

External links
 

1974 songs
Deep Purple songs
Rock ballads
Songs written by Ritchie Blackmore
Songs written by David Coverdale
British folk rock songs
2007 singles
Whitesnake songs
2015 singles
British blues rock songs